The Chalk Mountains are a mountain range in Archuleta County, Colorado.

References 

Mountain ranges of Colorado
Landforms of Archuleta County, Colorado